The Leinster Senior League Shield was a rugby competition in Ireland, involving lower-ranked senior rugby clubs in Leinster, i.e. clubs from Leinster competing in the lower divisions of the All-Ireland League.  It ran from 2011-12 until 2015-16. Previous to this, all senior teams competed together in the Leinster Senior League Cup.

The teams were drawn into two groups, the winners and runners-up of which entered the semi-finals.

Finals
 2011-12 Old Wesley 25-16 Greystones
 2012-13 Skerries 7-6 Naas
 2013-14 MU Barnhall 13-6 Naas
 2014-15 Wanderers 33-28 Greystones
 2015-16 Greystones 68-25 Wanderers

See also
 Leinster Senior League Cup

References

Rugby union competitions in Leinster
Irish senior rugby competitions